The Conmhaícne Mara or Conmaicne Mara (the Conmaicne of the sea), were an early people of Ireland. Their tuath was located in the extreme west of County Galway, Republic of Ireland, giving their name to Connemara, an anglicised form of Conmhaicne Mara.

Origin
The Conmhaícne or Conmaicne were a people of early Ireland, perhaps related to the Laigin, who dispersed to various parts of Ireland. They settled in Connacht and Longford, giving their name to several Conmaicne territories.  Other branches of the Conmaicne located in County Galway included the Conmaícne Dúna Móir (Conmaicne of Dunmore) and the Conmhaícne Cúile Toland (Conmaicne of Cuile-Toland).

Territory

Conmhaícne Mara comprised all of the barony of Ballynahinch and the civil parish of Inishbofin, which is in the barony of Murrisk. The territory contains the five civil parishes of Ballynakill/Baile na Cille, Ballindoon, Moyrus/Maigh Iorras, Omey/Iomaidh Fheicín and Inishbofin/Inis Bó Fine. The territory contains the five Catholic parishes of An Clochán (Clifden, Omey & Ballindoon), Iorras Ainbhtheach (Carna), Cloch na Rón/(Roundstone), Baile na Cille (Ballynakill) and Inis Bó Fine/(*Inishbofin (County Galway)).

The area of County Galway in which Connemara lies is known as Iar Connacht i.e. the portion of County Galway west of Lough Corrib and a small piece of County Mayo. The parish of Kilconickny, which means "church of the Conmaicne"is located west of the town of Loughrea.

History
The chiefs of the Conmaicne Mara were the O’Kealys, and their cadets were the MacConneelys, O’Devaneys, and O’Clohertys, with the O’Falons [Folan] as their hereditary brehons. The O’Kealys relocated to Ui Oirbsen, but they were to find themselves imposed upon again after just a few decades.  The MacConneelys stayed in their home at Ballyconneely Peninsula, but soon found themselves neighbors of the O’Flahertys.

A court inquisition in 1607 includes the following as leading chiefs of name in the barony of Ballynahinch:  O’Flaherty of Bunowen, MacConroy, MacConnor, MacDonough, O’Duan, O’Lee, and MacConneely.  MacConnor and MacDonough, are chiefs of branches that separated from the O’Flahertys, while the two after that, O’Duan and O’Lee, headed old followers of that family.  The MacConneelys were the eldest cadets of the O’Kealys of Conmaicne Mara.

Annalistic references

See Annals of Inisfallen

 AI1016.6 The slaughter of Ára, in which Ua Lochlainn, royal heir of Corcu Modruad, was killed in Port Ciaráin in Ára. It was the Conmaicne who slew him.
 AI1016.8 Death of Muiredach son of Cadla, king of Conmaicne Mara.

See also

 Uí Fiachrach Aidhne
 Clann Fhergail
 Clann Taidg
 Delbhna Tir Dha Locha
 Muintir Murchada
 Senchineoil
 Uí Maine
 Soghain
 Trícha Máenmaige
 Uí Díarmata
 Cóiced Ol nEchmacht
 Síol Anmchadha
 Iar Connacht
 Maigh Seola
 Cenél Áeda na hEchtge

References

Secondary sources

Bibliography
 Medieval Ireland: Territorial, Political and Economic Divisions, Paul MacCotter, Four Courts Press, 2008. 

History of County Galway
Historical ethnic groups of Europe
Ethnic groups in Ireland
Gaelic-Irish nations and dynasties
Conmaicne Mara